Patricia Wiberg is a professor at University of Virginia known for her research on the transport of sediments in aquatic environments.

Education and career 

Wiberg has a B.A. in mathematics from Brown University (1976), and an M.S. (1983) and a Ph.D. (1987) from the University of Washington. Wiberg is a fellow of the American Geophysical Union, and a fellow of the American Association for the Advancement of Science who cited her "for distinguished contributions to understanding the causes and consequences of sediment movements in aquatic systems."

Research 
Wiberg studies coastal environments with a focus on how disturbances such as storms, sea-level rise, and temperature change coastal areas Through her integration of data and models, she examines changes in salt marshes in the context of environmental changes. While in graduate school, Wiberg and colleagues found evidence in the Brazos River beds in Texas for a tsunami that was at least 1000 feet high which would have occurred at the Cretaceous-Tertiary boundary. She has also examined the impact of the shape of sediments on eddy correlation flux measurements. Since 2006, Wiberg has been a co-principal investigator at the National Science Foundation-funded Virginia Coast Reserve Long-Term Ecological Research where she has been working on water and sediment dynamics.

Selected publications

Awards and honors 
 Fellow, American Geophysical Union (2017)
Fellow, American Association for the Advancement of Science (2020)

References

External links 
 

Fellows of the American Geophysical Union
Brown University alumni
University of Washington alumni
University of Virginia faculty
Women hydrologists
Living people
Year of birth missing (living people)